Oreta rosea, the rose hooktip moth, is a moth in the family Drepanidae. It was described by Francis Walker in 1855. It is found in North America, where it has been recorded across boreal Canada to eastern North America. In the north, the range extends to northern Alberta, northern Manitoba and Newfoundland. It is also found east of the Great Plains as far south as Florida and eastern Texas. The habitat consists of moist temperate hardwood forests.

The wingspan is 25–34 mm. Typical adults are yellow with delicate pink in broad bands. The postmedial line on the forewings angles back sharply toward the costa below the apex. The postmedial line of the hindwings is wavy. Form irrorata is brown or brownish purple with dark lines. Adults are on wing from May to September in two generations per year.

The larvae feed on various hardwood species, including Betula and Viburnum species. The larvae are orange to brown. The head has two thorny projections on either side. Larvae can be found from July to October.

References

Moths described in 1855
Drepaninae